Ricky Hoyte (born 15 October 1969) is a former West Indian cricketer. He was a left-handed batsman and a wicket-keeper. He played first-class and List A cricket for Barbados in West Indian domestic cricket from 1990 to 1999. He didn't play Test cricket or One Day Internationals for West Indies but did play for them at "A" Team level. His father (David Murray) and grandfather (Everton Weekes) both played Test cricket for the West Indies.

References

External links
 

1969 births
Living people
Barbadian cricketers
Barbados cricketers
Cricketers at the 1998 Commonwealth Games
Commonwealth Games competitors for Barbados
Wicket-keepers